Samuel Salt (died 1792) was an English lawyer and Whig politician who sat in the House of Commons from 1768 to 1790. He is also known for his connection to the family of author Charles Lamb.

Early life
Salt was the son of John Salt, vicar of Audley, Staffordshire. He was admitted at the Middle Temple in 1741, at the Inner Temple in 1745, and was called to the bar in 1753. He was a Director of the South Sea Company from 1769 to 1775 and was deputy Governor from 1775 until his death.

Political career
Salt was a lawyer for the Eliot family of Port Eliot. He chose to sit for Liskeard and was returned there again in 1774 and 1780. In politics he was a Whig.

Crespigny's brother was also a director of the South Sea Company. Salt did not stand in 1790

Lamb family
John Lamb, father of Charles Lamb, was Salt's clerk for nearly 40 years. Charles was born in Crown Office Row, where Salt owned chambers, and it was the home of the Lamb family until 1792. Salt procured the admission of Charles to Christ's Hospital. Through Salt's s influence as a governor of the South Sea Company, Charles and his elder brother obtained clerkships under the company.

Later years
Salt became bencher at the Inner Temple in 1782,  reader in 1787 and treasurer in 1788. He died at his chambers in Crown Office Row, Inner Temple, on 27 July 1792, and was buried in a vault of the Temple Church. A shield with his coat-of-arms was placed in the sixteenth panel (counting from the west) on the north side of the Inner Temple hall. He was unmarried.

Notes

Attribution

Year of birth missing
1792 deaths
English barristers
Members of the Parliament of Great Britain for constituencies in Cornwall
People from Audley, Staffordshire
British MPs 1768–1774
British MPs 1774–1780
British MPs 1780–1784
Members of the Middle Temple
Members of the Inner Temple